Binlah Sonkalagiri is the pen-name of Thai author Wuthichat Choomsanit (วุฒิชาติ ชุ่มสนิท, born 1965). He won the S.E.A. Write Award in 2005 for his work, Chao Ngin (Princess).

Biography 

Wuthichat graduated high school from Mahavajiravudh Songkhla School in Songkhla Province.  He attended the Faculty of Communication Arts at Chulalongkorn University but did not graduate before starting his career as editor-in-chief Pai Yarn Yai, a publication belonging to writer and singer Suu Boonliang. He also worked as a reporter for Matichon and Khao Sod daily newspapers before turning to writing on his own in 1994.  He resides in Chiang Mai Province.

As Binlah Sonkalagiri his works include short stories, children's books, novels and travel documentaries. Under his real name, Wuthichat's works include Chan Duem Duang Arthit (I Drink the Sun), Kid Tung Took Pee (Miss You Every Year), Pla Chalarm Fun Lor (The Broken Tooth Shark), Duem Talay Sarb and Arb Talay Say (Drink in the Lake, Bathe in the Desert).

References 

Binlah Sonkalagiri
Binlah Sonkalagiri
Binlah Sonkalagiri
1965 births
Living people
S.E.A. Write Award winners
Binlah Sonkalagiri
Binlah Sonkalagiri
Binlah Sonkalagiri
20th-century novelists
21st-century novelists
20th-century short story writers
21st-century short story writers
Binlah Sonkalagiri
Binlah Sonkalagiri
20th-century male writers
21st-century male writers